First Business Bank, also known as FBBank, was a commercial bank that offered financial services to individuals, professionals and businesses in Greece.
It was founded in November 2001 and bought the Greek network of Bank of Nova Scotia.
The license of FBBank was revoked on 11 May 2013 and its assets and liabilities were bought by National Bank of Greece.

References

External links
 Official website

Defunct banks of Greece
Greek companies established in 2001
Banks established in 2000
Banks disestablished in 2013
2013 disestablishments in Greece